Switzerland was represented by Mariella Farré and Pino Gasparini with the song "Piano, piano" at the Eurovision Song Contest 1985, which took place in Gothenburg, Sweden on 4 May.

Before Eurovision

Concours Eurovision 1985 
Swiss-French broadcaster TSR was in charge of broadcasting the selection for the Swiss entry for the 1985 Contest. The national final took place on 23 February 1985 and was held at the studios of TSR in Genève, hosted by Serge Moisson. Nine songs were submitted for the 1985 national final and the winning song was chosen by 3 regional juries (DRS, TSR, TSI), a press jury, and a jury of experts.

Other participants included past Swiss representative Rainy Day, who had previously represented Switzerland the year before. Both Mariella Farré and Pino Gasparini had previously represented Switzerland: Farré represented Switzerland at the 1983 Contest whilst Gasparini had represented Switzerland at the 1977 Contest alongside the Pepe Lienhard Band.

At Eurovision
On the night Farré and Gasparini performed 16th on the night, following the United Kingdom and preceding Sweden. At the close of voting Switzerland had picked up 39 points, placing Switzerland in 12th place out of 19 entries. The Swiss jury awarded its 12 points to Turkey

The Swiss conductor at the contest was the composer of the song, Anita Kerr.

Voting

References

External links
  Swiss National Final 1985

1985
Countries in the Eurovision Song Contest 1985
Eurovision